The Cecilian Movement for church music reform began in Germany in the second half of the 1800s as a reaction to the liberalization of the Enlightenment.

The Cecilian Movement received great impetus from Regensburg, where Franz Xaver Haberl had a world-renowned school for church musicians. Their theoretical ideas were formulated by Ludwig Tieck, Friedrich and August Wilhelm Schlegel, Johann Michael Sailer, E. T. A. Hoffmann, and Anton Friedrich Justus Thibaut.

Institutionalization
Although the movement traced its roots back to the 15th-century , which in turn inspired the formation during the 18th century in Munich, Passau, Vienna, and other places of Caecilien-Bündnisse (Cecilian Leagues) with the goal of promoting the a cappella singing of sacred music (in keeping with the edicts of the Council of Trent), the Cecilian movement proper is considered to have been established only in the 19th century. Franz Xaver Witt, a priest trained in Regensburg, published a call for reform of church music and three years later, on the occasion of a rally of Catholics in Bamberg, founded the first formal body of the movement, the Allgemeiner Deutscher Cäcilienverein. After Pope Pius IX sanctioned this organization in 1870, similar groups soon sprang up in the Netherlands, Italy, Belgium, Poland, Bohemia, Hungary, Switzerland, and North America.

Chant reform
The deficiencies of the official version of the Gradual and Antiphonal, the Medicean edition of 1614, had become evident by the beginning of the 19th century. Calls for its reform led to publication of the Mechlin edition in 1848 which, despite a few attempts at correction retained many of the faults of the Medicean version. in 1871, Franz Xaver Haberl and the publisher Pustet of Regensburg reissued this edition of the Gradual, claiming it to be the work of Palestrina, which made it an initial success. They also issued an Antiphonal, based largely on the Venetian edition of 1580.

In 1904, a papal decree reinstated the readings of the Editio vaticana, effectively bringing the Regensburg chant-reform efforts to an end and rendering Haberl's internationally disseminated textbook Magister choralis unusable.

Publishers
The German publishing houses most closely associated with the Cecilian movement were Pustet in Regensburg, Schwann in Düsseldorf, and Böhm in Augsburg. Journals allied with the movement include Fliegende Blätter für katholische Kirchenmusik, Musica sacra, Cäcilienkalender, Kirchenmusikalisches Jahrbuch, and Gregoriusblatt in Germany, Chorwächter in Switzerland, Kirchenmusikalische Vierteljahresschrift and Wiener Blätter für katholische Kirchenmusik in Austria, and Caecilia in the United States.

Timeline
1848: Publication of the Mechlin Gradual
1852: Joseph d'Ortigue publishes Dictionnaire liturgique, historique et théorique de plain-chant et le musique d'église
1856: Karl Proske begins publication of Musica sacra
1868: Franz Xaver Witt founds Allgemeiner Cäcilien-Verband für Deutschland in Bamberg
1870: American Caecilian Society founded in Milwaukee
1871: Friedrich Pustet publishes the Ratisbon Edition of Gregorian chant for the Mass, followed in 1878 by music of the Divine Office
1874: Franz Xaver Haberl founds a Katholische Kirchenmusikschule (now the ) in Regensburg
1898: Lorenzo Perosi appointed to direct the Sistine Choir
1903: Pius X's motu proprio Tra le sollecitudini calls for the replacement of the Regensburg Gradual by a Vatican Edition (issued 1908) based on the work of Solesmes Abbey

Notes and references
Notes

References

Sources

 
 
 
  No. 35, No. 36 and No. 37

Further reading

 Bouvilliers, Dom Louis Adélard. 1935. "An Outlook on the Centenary of the Solesme School of Music". The Caecilia 61, no. 2 (February): 77–82.
 Fellerer, Karl Gustav. 1982. "Kirchenmusikalische Reformbestrebungen um 1800". Analecta Musicologica: Veröffentlichungen der Musikgeschichtlichen Abteilung des Deutschen Historischen Instituts in Rom 21:393–408.
 Grattan Flood, W. H. 1916. "Sidelights on German Commercialism: The Cecilian Movement in Ireland". The Musical Times 57, no. 875 (1 January): 28–29.
 Haberl, Franz Xaver. 1892. Magister Choralis: A Theoretical and Practical Manual of Gregorian Chant, for the Use of the Clergy, Seminarists, Organists, Choir-masters, Choristers, &c., second (English) edition, translated from the ninth German edition by Most Rev. Dr. Donnelly. Regensburg, New York, and Cincinnati: Frederick Pustet.
 Lonnendonker, Hans. 1980. "Deutsch-französische Beziehungen in Choralfragen. Ein Beitrag zur Geschichte des gregorianischen Chorals in der zweiten Hälfte des 19. Jahrhunderts". In Ut mens concordet voci: Festschrift Eugène Cardine zum 75. Geburtstag, edited by Johannes Berchmans Göschl, 280–295. St. Ottilien: EOS-Verlag. .
 Pfaff, Maurus. 1974. "Die Regensburger Kirchenmusikschule und der cantus gregorianus im 19. und 20. Jahrhundert". Gloria Deo-pax hominibus. Festschrift zum hundertjährigen Bestehen der Kirchenmusikschule Regensburg, Schriftenreihe des Allgemeinen Cäcilien-Verbandes für die Länder der Deutschen Sprache 9, edited by Franz Fleckenstein, 221–252. Bonn: Allgemeiner Cäcilien-Verband.
 Ruff, Anthony. 2008. "Beyond Medici: The Struggle for Progress in Chant". Sacred Music 135, no. 2 (Summer): 26–44.
 Scharnagl, August. 1994. "Carl Proske (1794–1861)". In Musica divina: Ausstellung zum 400. Todesjahr von Giovanni Pierluigi Palestrina und Orlando di Lasso und zum 200. Geburtsjahr von Carl Proske. Ausstellung in der Bischöflichen Zentralbibliothek Regensburg, 4. November 1994 bis 3. Februar 1995, Bischöfliches Zentralarchiv und Bischöfliche Zentralbibliothek Regensburg: Kataloge und Schriften, no. 11, edited by Paul Mai, 12–52. Regensburg: Schnell und Steiner.
 Schnorr, Klemens. 2004. "El cambio de la edición oficial del canto gregoriano de la editorial Pustet/Ratisbona a la de Solesmes en la época del Motu proprio". In El Motu proprio de San Pío X y la Música (1903–2003). Barcelona, 2003, edited by Mariano Lambea, introduction by María Rosario Álvarez Martínez and José Sierra Pérez. Revista de musicología 27, no. 1 (June) 197–209.
 Schwermer, Johannes. 1976. “Der Cäciliienismus”. In Geschichte der katholischen Kirchenmusik 2: Vom Tridentinum bis zur Gegenwart, edited by Karl Gustav Fellerer, 226–236. Kassel: Bärenreiter.
 Wilton, Peter. 2002. "Cecilian Movement". The Oxford Companion to Music, edited by Alison Latham. Oxford and New York: Oxford University Press.
 Zon, Bennett. 1997a. The English Plainchant Revival. Oxford: Oxford University Press.
 Zon, Bennett. 1997b. "Plainchant in Nineteenth-Century England: A Review of Some Major Publications of the Period". Plainsong and Medieval Music 6, no. 1 (April): 53–74.

Italian music
Catholic music